Moravci may refer to:

In Serbia:

 Moravci (Ljig), a settlement in the municipality of Ljig

In Slovenia:

 Moravci v Slovenskih Goricah, a settlement in the municipality of Ljutomer
 Moravske Toplice, a settlement in the municipality of Moravske Toplice (known as Moravci until 1983)